Sphecosoma linda is a moth in the subfamily Arctiinae. It was described by E. Dukinfield Jones in 1914. It is found in Brazil.

References

Moths described in 1914
Sphecosoma